Antietam Creek is a  tributary of the Schuylkill River in Berks County, Pennsylvania. It rises just south of Alsace Manor in Alsace Township. There are several non-named tributaries to the creek. It empties into the Schuylkill just south of Reading.

See also
List of Pennsylvania rivers

References

 Birdsboro 7.5 Minute Quadrangle, Department of the Interior, USGS.
 Fleetwood 7.5 Minute Quadrangle, Department of the Interior, USGS.

Rivers of Pennsylvania
Tributaries of the Schuylkill River
Rivers of Berks County, Pennsylvania